Thomas Morris Mitchell (30 September 1899 – 22 November 1984) was an English professional footballer and manager.

Playing career
Mitchell started his career with Newcastle United in 1920. He joined Leeds United in 1926. He left them for York City in 1931. Mitchell scored York's first goal at Bootham Crescent in a 2–2 draw with Stockport County on 31 August 1932.

Managerial career
He was appointed as York's manager in March 1937. He resigned in February 1950 and set up a family sport outfitter's shop in York. He later became a director at the club.

References

External links

1899 births
1984 deaths
People from Spennymoor
Footballers from County Durham
English footballers
Association football midfielders
Spennymoor United F.C. players
Blyth Spartans A.F.C. players
Newcastle United F.C. players
Leeds United F.C. players
York City F.C. players
English Football League players
English football managers
York City F.C. managers
English Football League managers
York City F.C. directors and chairmen